Kudirat Akhigbe (born 29 December 1981) is a Nigerian sprinter who specialized in the 400 metres.

She won bronze medals in the 4 × 400 metres relay at the 2002 and 2006 Commonwealth Games, and also competed individually in 2002 without reaching the final. At the 2002 African Championships she finished fifth in the 400 metres and won a silver medal in the 4 × 400 metres relay.

Her personal best time was 51.60 seconds, achieved in June 2001 in Seville.

References

1981 births
Living people
Nigerian female sprinters
Commonwealth Games bronze medallists for Nigeria
Commonwealth Games medallists in athletics
Athletes (track and field) at the 2002 Commonwealth Games
Athletes (track and field) at the 2006 Commonwealth Games
21st-century Nigerian women
Medallists at the 2002 Commonwealth Games
Medallists at the 2006 Commonwealth Games